Altweerterheide is a town in the Dutch province of Limburg. It is a part of the municipality of Weert, and lies about 4 km southwest of Weert.

In 2001, Altweerterheide had 514 inhabitants. The built-up area of the town was 0.14 km2, and contained 195 residences.

References

Populated places in Limburg (Netherlands)
Weert